BAFTA Cymru (or BAFTA in Wales or WAFTA) is the Welsh branch of the British Academy of Film and Television Arts (BAFTA) and was founded in 1987.

The British Academy Cymru Awards were established in 1991, with the first annual awards ceremony held on 30 November 1991. The annual ceremony takes place in Cardiff to recognise achievement in production, performance and craft categories in Welsh-made films and television programmes and by those of Welsh birth or residence. These are separate from the UK-wide British Academy Television Awards and British Academy Film Awards, although films and programmes recognised by BAFTA Cymru may also feature at BAFTA's national awards.

Categories 
 Television Drama (sponsored by Bad Wolf) 
 Factual Series 
 Entertainment Programme (sponsored by University of Wales Trinity Saint David) 
 News and Current Affairs (sponsored by Working Word) 
 Children's Programme (sponsored by FOR Cardiff) 
 Single Documentary (sponsored by Aberystwyth University) 
 Short Film (sponsored by University of South Wales) 
 Game (sponsored by Games Design at Glyndŵr University) 
 Presenter (sponsored by Deloitte) 
 Director: Fiction (sponsored by Champagne Taittinger) 
 Writer (sponsored by The Social Club. Agency) 
 Editing (sponsored by Gorilla) 
 Actor (sponsored by AUDI) 
 Actress (sponsored by Waterstone Homes) 
 Photography Factual (sponsored by Genero) 
 Photography and Lighting (sponsored by ELP) 
 Sound (sponsored by AB Acoustics) 
 Original Music (sponsored by Yr Egin) 
 Costume Design (sponsored by DRESD) 
 Siân Phillips Award (sponsored by Pinewood Studios Group) 
 Outstanding Contribution to Television

References

External links
British Academy Cymru Awards (BAFTA official website)
BAFTA official website

Organizations established in 1987
1987 establishments in Wales
Television in Wales
Cinema of Wales
Cymru
Welsh awards